The Girl (Spanish: La niña) is a Colombian drama produced by CMO producciones for Caracol Televisión. It is based on a true story that addresses the issue of minors in armed conflict and reintegration. The series was available on Netflix as an original series from 18 November 2016 to 19 November 2022, after acquiring the license rights.

Plot 
La niña, based on real-life facts, tells the story of a girl who has been forcibly recruited by the guerrillas. She experienced the horror of war first hand and after many years manages to leave the armed group to embark on a path of return to society that will not be easy for her. In the process of reintegration to the society she must face herself and her own family.

Cast 

 Ana María Estupiñán as Belky / Sara
 Sebastián Eslava as Manuel Monsalve
 Marcela Benjumea as Mireya Pinzón
 Marcelo Dos Santos as Decano Alfonso Montealegre
 Diego Vásquez as Coronel Luis Barragán
 Cristina Campuzano as Constanza Duque / Connie
 Juan Manuel Mendoza as Doctor Rodrigo Carrera
 Cony Camelo as Tatiana Toquica
 Santiago Alarcón as Doctor Horacio Fuentes
 Variel Sánchez as Victor Manjarrés
 Juan Sebastián Aragón as Coronel Javier Alzate
 Laura Perico as Juliana Montealegre
 Alberto Cardeño as Miguel Eslava
 Laura Archbold as Natalia Villamizar
 Carlos Felipe Sánchez as Santiago Caballero
 Martha Restrepo as Ángela Acosta de Barragán
 Fernando Arévalo as Padre Rivas
 Brenda Hanst as Doctora Silvia Lozano
 Fabio Velasco as Rigoberto Barón
 Roger Moreno as Esteban
 Juan Millán as Julio
 María Barreto as Yolima
 Victoria Ortíz as María Luisa Barragán
 Melissa Cáceres as Beatriz Eslava Pinzón

Guest stars 
Mike Bahía as Himself
 Yolanda Rayo as Herself
 Begner Vasquez as Himself

Episodes

Awards and nominations

India Catalina Awards

Platino Awards

References

External links 
 

2016 Colombian television series debuts
2016 Colombian television series endings
Colombian drama television series
Caracol Televisión original programming
Television shows set in Bogotá
Spanish-language Netflix original programming